Ray or Raymond Lawrence may refer to:
 Ray Lawrence (film director) (born 1948), Australian film director
 Ray Lawrence (record producer) (born 1927), American record company executive, record producer
 Raymond Douglas Lawrence, Australian organist
 Raymond Lawrence (actor) in Silks and Saddles

See also
 Lawrence Ray, Dutch presenter, producer and actor